Iain Anderson may refer to:

 Iain Anderson (cricketer) (born 1960), former English cricketer
 Iain Anderson (footballer) (born 1977), former professional footballer
 Iain Anderson (businessman) (born 1931), Scottish cricketer and automotive industry executive

See also 
 Ian Anderson (disambiguation)